Xia Jin (Chinese: 夏金; born 14 February 1985) is a Chinese football player who currently plays for Xinjiang Tianshan Leopard in the China League Two.

Club career
In 2005, Xia Jin started his professional footballer career with Chongqing Lifan in the Chinese Super League. He would eventually make his league debut for Chongqing on 6 July 2005 in a game against Liaoning Whowin, coming on as a substitute for Zhao Hejing in the 73rd minute.

In February 2015, Xia transferred to China League One side Guizhou Zhicheng.
On 14 March 2015, Xia transferred to China League Two side Chengdu Qbao.

Career statistics 
Statistics accurate as of match played 3 November 2018.

Honours

Club
Chongqing Lifan
China League One: 2014

References

External links
 

1985 births
Living people
Chinese footballers
Footballers from Chongqing
Chongqing Liangjiang Athletic F.C. players
Guizhou F.C. players
Xinjiang Tianshan Leopard F.C. players
Chinese Super League players
China League One players
Association football defenders